Chiyodai Baseball Stadium is a baseball stadium in Hakodate, Hokkaidō, Japan. The stadium has an all-seated capacity of 20,000.

References

Baseball venues in Japan
Sports venues in Hokkaido
Buildings and structures in Hakodate
Sports venues completed in 1950
1950 establishments in Japan